Nancy Ezer was a scholar, critic of Hebrew literature, author, and Senior Lecturer in Hebrew in the Department of Near Eastern Languages and Cultures at the University of California, Los Angeles.

Education
She earned her B.A. from Tel Aviv University as well as a teaching certificate. She received her master's degree in 1983 and her PhD in Hebrew literature, also from UCLA in 1987.

Teaching Experience
Ezer taught at UCLA from 1987 until her retirement in 2021. She offered courses in all levels of Hebrew and was conferred the Distinguished Teaching Award in 2007.
Ezer was also recognized in 2008 by the UCLA Office of Instructional Development for her technological achievement in successfully creating an electronic Hebrew workbook to facilitate the assimilation of the Hebrew language. 

In addition to her native Hebrew, she was also fluent in English and Arabic and had a working knowledge of French and Yiddish. Ezer was a member of the National Association of Professors of Hebrew, and since 2005, she served as the Book Review Editor of Hebrew Higher Education.

Publications
Workbook Hebrew 1ABC, Academic Publishing Service, UCLA, 1987
Literature and Ideology, Papyrus Publishing House at Tel Aviv University, Israel, 1992
From the Melancholy of an Individual to the Melancholy of a Social Class: From Brenner’s Breakdown and Bereavement to Shabtai’s Past Continuous, Dappim Research in Literature, Haifa University, Israel, 2002
Flirtation in S.Y. Agnon's Shira, History and Literature: New Readings of Jewish Texts in Honor of Arnold J. Band, ed. William Cutter and David C. Jacobson, Brown Judaic Studies, Brown University Press, Providence, 2002
Rena Lee's Stories Collection: Far From Home, Hadoar, V. 82, 2, New York, 2003
Allegory and Simulacra in Yuval Simoni's 'The Art of War', Iton 77, V. 288, Israel, 2004
Ideology, Melancholy and Postmodern Irony in Itzhak Laor's The People, Food Fit for a King, Alpayim, Israel, 2005
Black Humor and the Grotesque in Yitzhak Laor's Novel Ecce Homo, Alei-Siah, Hakibbutz Hameuchad Publishing House, Israel, 2007
Mother Daughter Dialectics: Socialization of Survival in David Grossman's novel The Book of Internal Grammar, Hador, The Hebrew Annual of America, V.2., 2008
The Terror Within and the Pagan Discourse: Yitzhak Laor's Postmodern Satire And With My Spirit, My Corpse, Jerusalem Studies in Hebrew Literature, V. 22, The Magnes Press, The Hebrew University, Israel, 2008
Beyond the Stereotypes of Old Age: Women and Aging in Joshua Kenaz's Novel The Way to the Cats, Hador, The Hebrew Annual of America, V.3., 2009
From Text to Context: The Reader and the Signification Process in Yuval Shimoni's A Room, Ma'ase Sipur, Bar-Ilan University Press, Israel, 2009
Hebrew Electronic Workbook: Rigorous Grammar Practice Outside the Classroom, Hebrew Higher Education, Published at the University of Wisconsin-Madison by the National Association of Professors of Hebrew in Institutions of Higher Learning, V. 13., 2010
Depression and Melancholia in Brenner's Breakdown and Bereavement, Hador, The Hebrew Annual of America, V.4., 2011
Between Comic Terror and Jewish Humor: Yitzhak Laor's As Much as You Give Me, Collection of Essays on Yitzhak Laor's Work, Hakibbutz Hameuchad Publishing House, Israel, 2011
Her various articles examine Modern and Post-Modern Hebrew novels, interrogating their rhetorical treatments of the Zionist meta-narrative and their conceptualization of an Israeli identity through various genres and literary modes.

References

External links
Nancy Ezer's UCLA Website
UCLA Faculty Experiences – Nancy Ezer

Israeli Jews
1947 births
2022 deaths
Tel Aviv University alumni
University of California, Los Angeles alumni
University of California, Los Angeles faculty
Hebrew-speaking people
University of California Near Eastern Languages and Cultures faculty